Weißkugel or Weißkogel is the second highest mountain in the Ötztal Alps and the third highest mountain in Austria. Featuring many glaciers, it lies on the border between Austria and Italy.  The easiest way to climb it is over its southern side.

The ascent by Joseph Anton Specht from Vienna, guided by Leander and Nicodem Klotz from Vent in 1861, was and is usually considered the first.  However,  personal notes of Archduke John of Austria about his excursion over the Niederjoch from Vent to Schnals in the summer of 1846, made public in 1903, suggest that his guides, Johann Gurschler and Josef Weitthalm from Schnals, had climbed the mountain the previous summer.

According to the second ascensionist, Douglas Freshfield, it has one of the best views in the Tyrol.

References

See also 

 List of the highest mountains in Austria

Mountains of Tyrol (state)
Mountains of South Tyrol
Mountains of the Alps
Alpine three-thousanders
Ötztal Alps
Austria–Italy border
International mountains of Europe